Dreamwheel is an EP by Spirit Caravan. It was released in 1999 on CD by MeteorCity Records and on 10" vinyl by People Like You Records. This was released shortly after their debut album, Jug Fulla Sun.

Track listing
"Dreamwheel" - 6:15
"Burnin' In" - 3:35
"Re-Alignment/High Power" - 2:28
"Sun Stoned" - 3:39
"C, Yourself" - 3:49

References

1999 EPs
Spirit Caravan albums
MeteorCity albums